This is a list of the butterflies of family Papilionidae, or the "swallowtails", which are found in Sri Lanka. It is part of the List of the butterflies of Sri Lanka

Graphium (Graphium) - bluebottles and jays

Papilio (Papilio) - swallowtails

Atrophaneura (Pachliopta) - roses

Troides - birdwings

References
Bernard d'Abrera (1986) Butterflies of the Oriental Region. Part 1: Papilionidae, Pieridae and Danaidae Hill House Publishers 
D'Abrera, B.L. (1998) The Butterflies of Ceylon. Hill House: Melbourne; London. 224 pp. 

Lists of butterflies of Sri Lanka
Papilionidae